Favour Aniekan (born 10 April 1994) is a Nigerian footballer who plays as a midfielder for RG Ticino.

Career

Before the 2014 season, Aniekan was sent on loan to Dainava in Lithuania from the youth academy of Milan, one of Italy's most successful clubs.

In 2015, he was sent on loan to Krka in the Slovenian top flight.

In 2017, he signed for Slovenian second division side Brda, before joining RG Ticino in the Italian fifth division.

References

External links
 

1994 births
Living people
Nigerian footballers
Association football midfielders
Nigerian expatriate footballers
FK Dainava Alytus players
NK Krka players
NK Brda players
Expatriate footballers in Italy
Expatriate footballers in Lithuania
Expatriate footballers in Slovenia
Nigerian expatriate sportspeople in Italy
Nigerian expatriate sportspeople in Lithuania
Nigerian expatriate sportspeople in Slovenia
A Lyga players
Slovenian PrvaLiga players
Slovenian Second League players